The infraglottic cavity is the portion of the larynx situated below the laryngeal ventricles and the rima glottidis.

External links
 
 
 
 Diagram at sci.port.ac.uk

Additional images

Human throat